In computing, the Motif Window Manager (MWM) is an X window manager based on the Motif toolkit.

Overview
MWM is a lightweight window manager, having robust compliance and configuration of the features it has.  MWM first appeared on in the early-1990s, along with the Motif toolkit.  MWM supports: Common User Interface (i.e., Alt-Tab is switch windows, a standard), some International support, Common Desktop Environment, X Resource Database (/home/app-defaults/ and runtime), X Session Manager protocol, X Edited Resource Protocol (edit widget data), desktop icons, optional use of images to decorate, and had supported Virtual desktop (removed since 2.1) but now supports non-virtual desktop panning.  MWM is a window manager, not a full desktop environment, so it only manages windows; it is expected that configuration, programs, sound, are provided by other programs.  A plain text file is parsed to customize menus, user input mappings, management features, and user made functions of the same.

Origins

Motif and MWM were created by the Open Software Foundation (Motif was sometimes even called "OSF/Motif") but is nowadays owned by The Open Group.

Licensing
Originally, MWM and Motif could only be purchased. The same software was also available as OpenMotif, though not on properly open-source or free software terms. In late 2012, Motif and MWM were released under the LGPL-2.1-or-later license as free software.

See also
FVWM
Visual User Environment

Notes

References

External links
SourceForge: Motif (source code)
SourceForge: Motif 2.0 build libXm.so.2.0.n (Data Display Debugger uses 2.0) with easier automake and optional panner

Motif: Volumes 6A and 6B (O'Reilly and Associates, free PDF downloads)

Free X window managers
Motif (software)